The Indonesia national korfball team is managed by the Indonesian Korfball Association (PKSI), representing Indonesia in korfball international competitions.

Tournament history

References 

National korfball teams
Korfball
National team